Pearl Stewart was the editor of the Oakland Tribune for one year beginning December 1992, the first African-American woman editor of a metropolitan daily newspaper. Said to be "well known for her dogged reporting," she was hired by David Burgin, who took a seven-month absence. The Tribune had recently been bought by the Alameda Newspaper Group where Burgin was editor-in-chief. She was intent on keeping the same style of the previous Tribune saying the negative stories about Oakland were important because it would be wrong to only highlight the good.

Stewart resigned when Burgin returned, saying that she respected him "but it is not possible for me to work with" him. At this time the newspaper was criticized for a lack of focus on minorities in Oakland. Before her position as editor for the Oakland Tribune she was a reporter for the San Francisco Chronicle from 1980 to 1991.

Later, she was director of career development and an instructor at Florida A&M's School of Journalism and Graphic Communication. While there she started the website Black College Wire which promotes journalism among HBCUs. In January 2005 she became managing editor of the "black-oriented Chicago Defender." She resigned two months later.

References

Year of birth missing (living people)
Living people
Editors of California newspapers
Editors of Illinois newspapers
Oakland Tribune people
Writers from the San Francisco Bay Area
African-American history in Oakland, California